The 1980 Eisenhower Trophy took place October 8 to 11 on the No. 2 course at the Pinehurst Country Club in Pinehurst, North Carolina. It was the 12th World Amateur Team Championship for the Eisenhower Trophy and the second time the event had been held in the United States, after the 1960 event. The tournament was a 72-hole stroke play team event with 39 four-man teams. The best three scores for each round counted towards the team total.

United States won the Eisenhower Trophy for the eighth time, finishing 27 strokes ahead of the silver medalists, South Africa. Chinese Taipei took the bronze medal, nine strokes further behind, while Japan finished fourth. Hal Sutton had the lowest individual score, 12-under-par 276, six strokes better than any other player.

Teams
39 four-man teams contested the event.

Scores

Source:

Individual leaders
There was no official recognition for the lowest individual scores.

Source:

References

External links
Record Book on International Golf Federation website 

Eisenhower Trophy
Golf in Pennsylvania
Eisenhower Trophy
Eisenhower Trophy
Eisenhower Trophy